The Prodigal Son is a 2018 studio album, the sixteenth to be released by American singer-songwriter and multi-instrumentalist Ry Cooder. The album was released on May 11, 2018 by Concord and Perro Verde record labels. The record also produced two singles.

Background
A successor to his 2012 album Election Special, and Cooder's first album in six years, The Prodigal Son seeks a return to the Gospel-infused spirit of his early career. Notably, the album features covers of the songs of the likes of Blind Alfred Reed, the Pilgrim Travelers and the Stanley Brothers alongside three original compositions.

According to Cooder, the album was born primarily from Cooder's 2015–16 tour alongside bluegrass musicians Ricky Skaggs and Sharon White of The Whites and finds a basis in incorporating elements of some of the white gospel music performed during the tour.

To promote the album, two in-studio video performances were released to the official Ry Cooder YouTube channel, one of "Straight Street" and one of the album's title track.

Reception
In a five-starred 2018 review for The Irish Times, Joe Breen said: "Ry Cooder hasn’t lost the activist voice that drove Election Special, his last new album, just before Obama's re-election, but The Prodigal Son is a softer shade of his political self, more balm than brute force."

Giving the album four stars, Terry Staunton, writing in Record Collector, said "Cooder astutely plunders the grammar of the nation’s folk music history with remarkable results. Three of its 11 songs come from his own pen, but elsewhere his archival skills come to the fore, referencing such bygone chroniclers as The Stanley Brothers and Blind Willie Johnson... Key to the album’s success is Cooder’s regular collaborator, son Joachim, with whom he’s worked for close to 25 years. Serving as intuitive drummer and keen-eared co-producer, he is integral to fashioning a set of songs that while acknowledging the rich tapestry of the US’ folk past ring loud and clear with modern-day truths."

Hal Horowitz, in a four-starred review for American Songwriter, said: "Cooder has returned to a similar basic blueprint of stripped-down gospel, backwoods and folk blues that got him started on his twisting musical journey all those years ago... this long-awaited comeback of sorts for Cooder is a joyful, intense and occasionally humorous experience that any Americana fan will enjoy."

Track listing

Charts

Weekly charts

Year-end charts

References

External links
 

2018 albums
Ry Cooder albums
Blues rock albums by American artists
Albums produced by Ry Cooder